Aquisphaera is a chemoheterotrophic genus of bacteria from the family of Isosphaeraceae with one known species (Aquisphaera giovannonii). Aquisphaera giovannonii has been isolated from sediments from a freshwater aquarium from Porto in Portugal.

See also 
 List of bacterial orders
 List of bacteria genera

References

Bacteria genera
Monotypic bacteria genera
Planctomycetota